Enemies of Children is a 1923 American silent drama film directed by Lillian Ducey and John M. Voshell that was based upon the novel Youth Triumphant by George Gibbs. It is the only screen director credit for Ducey and one of two for Voshell. Both were in the film industry in other fields. This was an independent production released by independent distributor Mammoth Pictures.

Cast

Preservation
With no prints of Enemies of Children located in any film archives, it is a lost film.

References

External links

Lantern slide

1923 films
American silent feature films
Lost American films
Films based on American novels
1923 drama films
American black-and-white films
Silent American drama films
1923 lost films
Lost drama films
1920s American films